Istgah-e Khosravi (also Romanized as Īstgāh-e Khosravī; also known as Khosravī, Khosrovi, and Khusrovīeh) is a village in Mosharrahat Rural District, in the Central District of Ahvaz County, Khuzestan Province, Iran. At the 2006 census, its population was 458, in 81 families.

References 

Populated places in Ahvaz County